Judyty  is a village in the administrative district of Gmina Sępopol, within Bartoszyce County, Warmian-Masurian Voivodeship, in northern Poland, close to the border with the Kaliningrad Oblast of Russia.

Notable residents

Eberhard von Kuenheim (born 1928), industrial manager

References

Judyty